Martin Poljovka (born 9 January 1975) is a former Slovak football defender who recently played for the Corgoň Liga club Banská Bystrica.

External links
 

1975 births
Living people
Association football defenders
Slovak footballers
Slovakia international footballers
Slovak Super Liga players
FK Dukla Banská Bystrica players
FC Spartak Trnava players

Association football forwards
Sportspeople from Banská Bystrica